The following is a list of the MTV Europe Music Award winners and nominees for Artist on the Rise.

MTV Europe Music Awards
Awards established in 2013